Ticháček (feminine Ticháčková) is a Czech surname. Notable people with the name include:

 Jiří Ticháček, Czech orienteering competitor
 Josef Tichatschek, Bohemian opera singer
 Lukáš Ticháček (born 1982), Czech volleyball player
 Martin Ticháček (born 1981), Czech football coach and a former player

See also

References 

Czech-language surnames